Panama competed at the 1988 Summer Olympics in Seoul, South Korea.

Competitors
The following is the list of number of competitors in the Games.

Results by event

Swimming
Men's 100m Breaststroke
 Manuel Gutierrez
 Heat – 1:06.73 (→ did not advance, 49th place)

Men's 200m Breaststroke
 Manuel Gutierrez
 Heat – 2:26.57 (→ did not advance, 40th place)

References

Official Olympic Reports

Nations at the 1988 Summer Olympics
1988
1988 in Panamanian sport